Jus primae noctis is a 1972 Italian comedy film directed by Pasquale Festa Campanile.

Plot 
Ariberto de Ficulle is a nobleman who came into possession of a small feud by marrying the ugly Matilde Montefiascone. Domineering in the village and fighting constantly with Gandolfo, Ariberto, not satisfied, also restores the "ius primae noctis".

Cast 
 Lando Buzzanca as  Ariberto da Ficulle 
 Renzo Montagnani as Gandolfo 
 Marilù Tolo as Venerata
 Felice Andreasi as Friar Puccio 
 Toni Ucci as Guidone 
 Paolo Stoppa as the pope
 Gino Pernice as Marculfo
 Ely Galleani as Beata
 Alberto Sorrentino as the friar 
 Giancarlo Cobelli as Curiale 
 Ignazio Leone 
 Clara Colosimo

References

External links

1972 films
Italian comedy films
1972 comedy films
Films directed by Pasquale Festa Campanile
1970s Italian films